Old school, Old School, or Old Skool may refer to:

Computers and gaming
Old school gaming or retrogaming, playing and collecting older computer, video, and arcade games
Old School Renaissance, a trend in tabletop gaming
Old School RuneScape, a playable 2007 version of the MMORPG RuneScape
Oldskool, in demoscene, a production made before the mid-1990s

Film and television
Old School (film), a 2003 American comedy film
Old School (TV series), a 2014 Australian drama series
"Old School" (Brooklyn Nine-Nine), a 2013 television episode
"Old School" (Runaways), a 2018 television episode
"Old School" (Yin Yang Yo!), a 2006 television episode

Literature
Old School (novel), a 2003 novel by Tobias Wolff
Old School: Life in the Sane Lane, a 2017 book by Bill O'Reilly and Bruce Feirstein
Diary of a Wimpy Kid: Old School, a 2015 book by Jeff Kinney

Music

Genres
Old-school hip hop
Oldskool hardcore or breakbeat hardcore
Urban oldies, or Old School, a radio format

Performers
Old School (quartet), an American barbershop quartet
Ol' Skool, an American new jack swing group

Albums
Old School (Helix album), 2019
Oldschool (Nena album), 2015
Ol' School, by Ohio Players, 1996
Old School (EP), by Tebey, 2016
Old Skool (EP), by Armin van Buuren, 2016
Old School, a box set by Alice Cooper, 2011

Songs
"Old School" (Hedley song), 2008
"Old School" (John Conlee song), 1985
"Old School", by Boss Hog, 1999
"Old School", by Danger Doom from The Mouse and the Mask, 2005
"Old School", by Overkill from ReliXIV, 2005
"Old School", by Toby Keith from Peso in My Pocket, 2021
"Old School", by Tupac Shakur, a B-side of "Dear Mama", 1995

Other uses
Old school (tattoo), a traditional tattoo style
Old School–New School Controversy, a schism of the Presbyterian Church in the United States of America
Old School, or arm twist ropewalk chop, a professional wrestling aerial technique used by The Undertaker
Koryū, translated as "old school", a category of Japanese martial arts

See also
 
 
 Vintage (design)
 Jeune École